Ha'Or m'Zion ( - The Light From Zion) is the debut album by an Israeli hip-hop artist Subliminal. It was released in 2000.

Track listing

2000 albums
Subliminal (rapper) albums
Albums produced by Ori Shochat